Incorporation of Polish children into the Imperial Russian Army occurred during and after the defeat of the November Uprising (1830–1831), when  Polish adolescents were incorporated into the Imperial Army of the Russian Empire.

In March 1831, in accordance with Tsar Nicholas I, the children of those who took part in the November Uprising were treated as cantonists and incorporated into special battalions of the Imperial Russian Army. A March 24, 1832 ukase ordered the assignment to special children's battalions of adolescent boys, 7 to 16 years of age, children of political exiles, orphans, those of the poor and homeless. Several thousand children were taken.

References

Partitions of Poland
Military occupations of Poland